William Currie, (26 February 1756 – 3 June 1829), was an English land owner, distiller, banker and Member of Parliament  for Gatton and Winchelsea.

On his father's death in 1781, he inherited his father's 75% interest in the distilling partnership his father had started with Nathaniel Byles.  He also became a partner in the family banking firm, replacing his father, but seems to have taken no active part, leaving the responsibilities to his brother Isaac.

In 1792, Currie was elected as a member of the American Philosophical Society in Philadelphia.

He is chiefly remembered for the restoration of the village of East Horsley and its manor house, East Horsley Towers.

Family
He was the eldest son of William Currie (1721–1781) and Magdalen Lefevre (a great aunt of Charles Shaw-Lefevre, 1st Viscount Eversley), and was baptised at the Church of St. Dunstan's in Stepney on 4 March 1756.

Currie married Percy Gore on 23 June 1794, the daughter of a banking partner, by whom he had a daughter, Percy Gore Currie, and two sons, William and Henry.  Percy Gore Currie married the Right Reverend Horatio Powys, son of Thomas Powys, 2nd Baron Lilford.  The eldest son, William, was a great connoisseur and collector of works of art, and had excellent taste. He left his major collection of gems, camei, intagli, Etruscan scarabei and Etruscan gold ornaments to the Uffizi Gallery in Florence. The second son, Henry, went on to be MP for Guildford between 1847 and 1852.

Three of his nephews were Sir Frederick Currie, 1st Baronet, Vice Admiral Mark John Currie and Raikes Currie, Member of Parliament for Northampton

East Horsley
Currie bought a substantial property, Horsley Towers, at East Horsley, in 1784 although it was not until 1820 that he commissioned Sir Charles Barry to build a second manor house in the Elizabethan style on the site.  In 1792, an Inclosure Act enabled him to enclose most of Horsley Common at the northern end of the parish and the common fields and waste at the southern part. He created an open park, grubbing up hedges, but leaving trees standing and planting others. He restored the church of St Martin, established a school and improved or rebuilt most of the houses in the village. "He fortunately had opportunities of purchasing nearly all the other land in the parish; and happily for himself, his family, and all the inhabitants of the parish, he had the means with which to make those purchases. We say happily for the inhabitants of the parish, for a more benevolent man, and family, never blessed a village or neighbourhood."

Subsequent owners of the East Horsley estate were the 1st Earl of Lovelace, whose wife was Ada Lovelace, the computer pioneer and Lord Byron's daughter, and Sir Thomas Sopwith, the founder of the Sopwith Aviation Company, which featured predominantly in the First World War.  After that war, the estate was broken up and sold in lots.

Member of Parliament
Currie was returned in 1790 as Member of Parliament for Gatton. He continued there until the 1796 election, when he was returned for Winchelsea until 1802.

Gatton and Winchelsea were rotten boroughs and Gatton was an extreme example.  It returned two MPs to the House of Commons, but only two constituents were entitled to vote, one of whom was William's brother, Mark Currie, the owner of Upper Gatton Park.  Winchelsea also returned two MPs to Westminster, but had seven voters.

In Parliament, Currie made no known speech. He was in favour of the unsuccessful attempt to repeal the Test Act in Scotland in 1791 and voted with the opposition in the Oczakov debates of 12 April 1791 and 12 March 1792, but appears to have become a supporter of the administration afterwards.
He voted for Pitt's assessed taxes on 4 January 1798, but made no further mark in the House, although on 9 December 1801 he was appointed to the Committee on East India judicature.

References

External links
 Portrait of William Currie (1756-1829)

1756 births
1829 deaths
Members of the Parliament of Great Britain for English constituencies
Members of the Parliament of the United Kingdom for English constituencies
British MPs 1790–1796
British MPs 1796–1800
UK MPs 1801–1802